The men's road race at the 1977 UCI Road World Championships was the 44th edition of the event. The race took place on Sunday 4 September 1977 in San Cristóbal, Venezuela. The race was won by Francesco Moser of Italy.

Final classification

References

Men's Road Race
UCI Road World Championships – Men's road race
1977 Super Prestige Pernod